Onychargia atrocyana a species damselfly in the family Platycnemididae. This species is commonly known as the marsh dancer or black marsh dart. It is found in Asia: Bangladesh, China, Hong Kong, Indonesia, India, Sri Lanka, Myanmar, Malaysia, Philippines, Peninsular Malaysia, Singapore, Thailand, Viet Nam.

Description and habitat
It is a medium sized damselfly with velvet-black head, thorax and black-capped brown eyes. The dorsum of the thorax has narrow citron-yellow ante humeral stripes in the sub-adult and teneral stage. The sides are citron-yellow, marked with a broad oblique black stripe over the postero-lateral suture in that stage. But all these marks are obscured by pruinescence in adults. Abdomen is black, unmarked in the adult; but with narrow bluish basal rings on segments 3 to 6. There are yellow marks on the lateral sides of segment 1 and 2 in sub-adults. Female is similar to the sub-adult male with yellow marks. 

It breeds in ponds and marshes in forests.

See also 
 List of odonates of India
 List of odonata of Kerala

References

Query Results
Singapore Odonata by Tang Hung Bun

External links 

Platycnemididae
Insects described in 1865